American Idol is an American singing competition television series created by Simon Fuller; it is produced by Fremantle and 19 Entertainment. It began airing on Fox in the United States on June 11, 2002, and ended on April 7, 2016. The series moved to ABC with its sixteenth season which debuted on March 11, 2018. It started off as an addition to the Idols format based on the British series Pop Idol, and became one of the most successful shows in the history of American television. The concept of the series involves discovering recording stars from unsigned singing talents, with the winner determined by the viewers in America through telephones, Internet, and SMS text voting.

Series overview

Episodes

Season 1 (2002)

Season 2 (2003)

Season 3 (2004)

Season 4 (2005)

Season 5 (2006)

Season 6 (2007)

Season 7 (2008)

Season 8 (2009)

Season 9 (2010)

Season 10 (2011)

Season 11 (2012)

Season 12 (2013)

Season 13 (2014)

Season 14 (2015)

Season 15 (2016)

Season 16 (2018)

Season 17 (2019)

Season 18 (2020)

Season 19 (2021)

Season 20 (2022)

Season 21 (2023)

Most watched episodes
American Idol has seen its fair share of viewership changes over the years. The show had 38.1 million viewers in the finale of season 2 and an all-time low with a mere 5.55 million viewers tuning in to watch the final performances of the fourteenth season.

References

External links
 
 

 
Lists of American reality television series episodes